Oi Man Estate is a public housing estate in No. 12 Hill, Kowloon, Hong Kong. It is the largest public housing estate in Kowloon City District and has a total of 12 residential blocks which were completed between 1974 and 1975. It was officially opened by the Acting Governor Sir Denys Roberts on 20 November 1975.

Chun Man Court is a Home Ownership Scheme court on No. 12 Hill, near Oi Man Estate. It consists of 12 blocks built in 1981.

Background
The estate was built at a cost of $186 million and comprises 6,200 flats designed to house some 46,000 residents based on the Housing Authority's former space allocation standards of 35 square feet per person. The "authorised population" of Oi Man Estate has since been revised to 18,900 residents. It was designed by Housing Department architects, and followed the 1970s estate design innovation of being planned as to "provide every convenience for its residents from banks, markets to barbershops." To this end the estate opened with a three-storey air-conditioned commercial complex, a market, and cooked food stalls.

The British Hong Kong Government admired the construction of the estate because its construction showed improvements in public housing standards in Hong Kong. Oi Man Estate was on the itinerary of Queen Elizabeth II when she visited Hong Kong in 1975. Leader of the British Conservative Party Margaret Thatcher also visited in 1977 and toured Tak Man House, commenting on the modern living conditions, cleanliness of the block, and the cool air circulating within the Twin Tower block's atrium.

Houses

Oi Man Estate

Chun Man Court

Demographics
According to the 2016 by-census, Oi Man Estate had a population of 18,282 while Chun Man Court had a population of 4,935. Altogether the population amounts to 23,217.

Politics
For the 2019 District Council election, the estate fell within two constituencies. Most of the estate and Chun Man Court are located in the Oi Chun constituency, which is represented by Cho Wui-hung, while the remainder of the estate falls within the Oi Man constituency, which is represented by Mak Sui-ki.

Education
Oi Man Estate (including Chun Man Court) is in Primary One Admission (POA) School Net 34. Within the school net are multiple aided schools (operated independently but funded with government money) and two government schools: Farm Road Government Primary School and Ma Tau Chung Government Primary School.

See also

Public housing estates in Ho Man Tin

References

Ho Man Tin
Housing estates with centralized LPG system in Hong Kong